The Roman Museum Remchingen (German: Römermuseum Remchingen) is a Museum in Remchingen, Germany from Jeff Klotz.

In the museum you can find, among other things, the walls of a Roman house.

History 
In 2007, when a house was being built in Remchingen, a Roman wall was uncovered, according to studies it was part of a Roman-era house. After that, more Roman things were found in the area. After the foundation walls had been completely exposed, the Roman Museum Remchingen project was launched. The museum was opened in 2009 under the leadership of Jeff Klotz.

In 2016, a floor and other Roman artifacts were found in the museum area. The floor was shown as part of a traveling exhibition in Berlin, among other places. A small park was created at the site where other finds, such as a piece of a Roman court floor, are presented.

Exhibitions 

 2014: Look where you live (Schau mal, wo du lebst)
 2016: Women on the move (Frauen im Aufbruch)
 2018: Myth of Jerusalem (Mythos Jerusalem)
 2021: Peregrinatio - The story of pilgrimage and pilgrimage (Peregrinatio – Die Geschichte des Pilgerns und der Wallfahrt)

Museum offers 
The museum is open on weekdays, Fridays, Saturdays and Sundays. Group tours are offered, also for school classes and other groups. The museum also has a museum cafe. There are various themed exhibitions.

Management of the museum 
The museum was founded by Jeff Klotz. The museum is managed by Jeff Klotz, Anna Panteleit and Monika Foemer. The Roman Museum employs 60 employees, some of whom are volunteers.

History around the museum 
The museum deals with the life of the Romans and Gauls in what is now Remchingen. In the first century, the Romans relocated Gauls to the southwest, where there were only few places. This is how this settlement was laid out in Remchingen.

List of finds in Remchingen 

 Roman estate in Remchingen-Wilferdingen
 Roman road in the city forest of Remchingen
 Roman house in the Remchingen district of Wilferdingen
 Antiques like a vase or screws all over Remchingen

Gallery

External links 

 Official website (German)

References 

Remchingen
Museums in Baden-Württemberg